William Logan Barry (February 9, 1926 – May 22, 2013) was an American lawyer and politician.

Born in Lexington, Tennessee, Barry served in the United States Army in Japan. He received his bachelors and law degrees from Vanderbilt University and practiced law. Barry served on the Lexington, Tennessee city council in 1953. He then served in the Tennessee House of Representatives 1954–1967, as a Democrat, and was the speaker. He died in Lexington, Tennessee.

References

1926 births
2013 deaths
People from Lexington, Tennessee
Vanderbilt University alumni
Vanderbilt University Law School alumni
Tennessee lawyers
Tennessee city council members
Speakers of the Tennessee House of Representatives
Democratic Party members of the Tennessee House of Representatives
21st-century American politicians
20th-century American lawyers
American expatriates in Japan